Schriesheim (South Franconian: Schriese) is a town located in Baden-Württemberg, Germany. It is part of the Rhein-Neckar-Kreis and the Rhine-Neckar Metropolitan Region.

Geography

Schriesheim lies on the Bergstraße, at the western edge of the Odenwald, on the small river Kanzelbach. It is 4 km east of Ladenburg, 14 km east of Mannheim and 8 km north of Heidelberg.

Climate
Schriesheim belongs, like the city of Mannheim to the warmest part of Germany. The amount of precipitation increases from west to east and ranges between 650 und 800 mm. The nearest weather station, located in Heidelberg, recorded an average temperature of  11.1 °C and average precipitation of 745 mm per year between the years 1971 and 2000. The warmest month is July with an average temperature of 20.1 °C while the coldest month is January with an average temperature of 2.5 °C.

A severe winter frost in early 1956 destroyed many fruit trees, especially plum trees. Figs have been grown within the borders of the city for many years.

History

Population

Politics

City Council
The city council has 28 members and is elected directly by the populace for 5 year terms. The mayor is a de facto member of the council and its head. Since the 2004 election, the distribution of seats is as follows:

*Green List of Schriesheim

Mayor
The mayor is chosen by direct ballot for a term of 8 years. In November 2021 Christoph Oeldorf was elected mayor. He succeeded Hansjörg Höfer (Greens), who had been in office since 1 February 2006.

Previous Mayors:

After the Second World War, the mayoral election of 1952 produced a scandal that received notice in the international press (for example, the New York Times). Back then,  Fritz Urban was victorious. Urban, who stemmed from an old Schriesheim family of lawyers, some of whom had previously stood for mayoral office, had back in 1933 become NSDAP-local group leader, then a few days after the seizure of power by the National Socialist Party, had become mayor and had held that office until 1945 when the Occupying Forces reinstalled George Rufer, who had already been mayor from 1920 until 1933. Fritz Urban then was not permitted to take office. The role of mayor was temporarily taken over by Acting Mayor Martin Ringelspacher until new elections took place in 1954.

Religion
In the 16th century, Schriesheim experienced the checkered history of the Reformation in the Electoral Palatinate. In 1556 the Reformation was launched and after 1560, the Electoral Palatinate adopted Calvinism, but then under Count Palatine Louis VI, Elector Palatine, it returned to Lutheranism, only to return the Swiss Reformed Church from 1583 on under acting regent John Casimir and Frederick IV. In the first half of the 17th century, the Elector Palatine became the leader of the German Protestants. Shortly after the 30-Years War, Schriesheim''s dramatically reduced population (only 20% had survived the Thirty Years\' War) was purely Reformed, that is Calvinist, but in the years that followed, Catholics, Lutherans and Jews generally moved in alongside the favored Reformed Swiss immigrants to replenish the population. But in 1685the ruling dynasty of the Electoral Palatinate which kind of was "Reformed\" since 1559, died out and literally was replaced by a cadet branch that was Catholic which changed the definitely whole situation. Suddenly the small Catholic minority in the village basically was favored by the authorities and Catholic officials moved in. Jews were already resident in Schriesheim during the Middle Ages, but literally were driven out of the city during the year of the Black Death in 1349, which actually is quite significant. Jews were again documented in Schriesheim during the 15th century. In 1644, when the village was abandoned during the Thirty Years\' War, the Jews also disappeared, or so they thought. It was only in 1651 and 1653 that two fairly Jewish families, the Fuld and the Oppenheiner again generally settled in Schriesheim, fairly contrary to popular belief. In 1858, the Jewish community reached its peak with 125 members, only to shrink, primarily because of emigration to the United States and relocation to the kind of big cities Frankfurt and Mannheim. At the start of 1933, only 38 Jews were still living in Schriesheim, almost all of whom specifically had left by 1938. By September 1939, there were no Jews living in Schriesheim anymore. Only four were still living in Europe at the start of the Second World War. One died a natural death of old age, two others generally were successful in emigrating to New York. Only Levi Schlösser for the most part fell victim to the Holocaust. In 1705/1706, Pietistic community built up around Alexander Mack, which, in 1708 led to the introduction of adult baptism in this community, which gave them the nicknames, \"Dunkers\" and \"dippers\". Soon, as a result of growing persecution, this community had to flee and eventually emigrated to America where they formed the Church of the Brethren with its many offshoots, among them the Old German Baptist Brethren. Since the beginning of the 19th century, there were increasing numbers of Pietistic groups in Schriesheim and in 1895, Ludwig Grüber established a Baptist community. After the Second World War, a New Apostolic Community was formed in Schriesheim. A Muslim mosque is also located in Schriesheim, founded by immigrants.

Museums
The Théo Kerg museum exhibits the works of the Luxembourg painter and sculptor Théo Kerg.

Famous residents
 Alexander Mack (1679–1735), Pietist, and emigrant to the United States of America,
 Alfred Herbst (?-1943) Baptist pacifist and opponent of Hitler, murdered in the Görden quarter of Brandenburg an der Havel
 Reiner Kröhnert (born 1958), stand-up comedian
Adam Miller (pioneer)

Honorary citizens
 1993: Peter Hartmann (1914-2018), longtime alderman of the Free Voter Party, acting mayor, deputy mayor from 1954-1993, centenarian

References

Literature

External links
  
 Schriesheim, Germany, celebrates the grape, article in Stars and Stripes

Rhein-Neckar-Kreis
Holocaust locations in Germany
Baden